Sphenophyllum is a genus in the order Sphenophyllales.

References

Horsetails
Fossils of Georgia (U.S. state)
Paleozoic life of New Brunswick
Paleozoic life of Nova Scotia
Paleozoic life of Prince Edward Island